Provincial road N709 (N709) is a road connecting N708 in Biddinghuizen with N309 near Elburg.

External links

709
709